John Chamber may refer to:

John Chamber (academic) (1546–1604), English clergyman and author, especially on astronomy and astrology
John Chambre (1470–1549), also Chamber or Chambers, English clergyman, academic and physician

See also
John Chambers (disambiguation)